Juris Luzins (born June 22, 1947) is a retired American middle-distance runner of Latvian descent. He won the national 800 m title in 1971 and placed second in 1969. He missed the 1972 Olympics due to an injury, and later raced professionally.

Luzins married in 1973, divorced in 1975, and remarried later. In December 1976 he earned a master's degree in architecture from the University of Florida and later worked as an architect in Gainesville, Florida.

References

1947 births
Living people
American people of Latvian descent
American male middle-distance runners
University of Florida alumni
Track and field athletes from Virginia
Florida Gators men's track and field athletes
American architects